John Christian Miller (born 1942 in Brooklyn) is an American author and screenwriter. He is best known for his work on National Lampoon magazine and the film Animal House, which he also acted in with co-writer/actor Douglas Kenney. The latter was inspired by Miller's own experiences in the Alpha Delta Phi fraternity at Dartmouth College, in which he went by the name "Pinto". Miller graduated from Dartmouth in 1963.

Filmography

Bibliography

Screw (1968) 
National Lampoon (1970)
National Lampoon's Animal House: The Full-Color, Illustrated Novel from the Hit Movie (1978) 
The Real Animal House: The Awesomely Depraved Saga of the Fraternity That Inspired the Movie (2006)

Notes

External links
 ]

1942 births
Living people
American humorists
American male screenwriters
Tuck School of Business alumni
National Lampoon people